The 2019–20 Oklahoma State Cowboys basketball team represented Oklahoma State University in the 2019–20 NCAA Division I men's basketball season. They were led by third-head coach Mike Boynton Jr. The Cowboys were members of the Big 12 Conference and played their home games at Gallagher-Iba Arena in Stillwater, Oklahoma.

Previous season 
The Cowboys finished the 2018–19 season with 12–20, 5–13 in Big 12 play to finish in ninth place. The Cowboys suffered significant roster attrition and finished the season with only 7 scholarship players, their season ending with first-round loss in the Big 12 men's basketball tournament to TCU.  Graduate transfer Mike Cunningham left the program, and then three players were subsequently dismissed from the team for their connection with in an automobile vandalism incident.

Departures

Incoming Transfers

Recruits

Future recruits

2020–21 team recruits

Roster

Schedule and results

|-
!colspan=9 style=|Exhibition

|-
!colspan=9 style=|Regular season

|-
!colspan=9 style=| Big 12 tournament

|- style="background:#bbbbbb"
| style="text-align:center"|Mar 12, 20201:30 pm, ESPN2
| style="text-align:center"| (8)
| vs. (1) No. 1 KansasQuarterfinals
| colspan=2 rowspan=1 style="text-align:center"|Canceled due to the COVID-19 pandemic
| style="text-align:center"|Sprint CenterKansas City, MO

Rankings

*AP does not release post-NCAA Tournament rankings

References 

Oklahoma State
Oklahoma State Cowboys basketball seasons
Oklahoma State Cowboys bask
Oklahoma State Cowboys bask